FC Azhar (Ajar Fýtbol Klýby) were a Kazakhstani football club based in Kokshetau, Kazakhstan. They were  members of the Kazakhstan Super League in just two seasons 1992 and 1993.

Name History
1992 : Founded as Zenit Kokshetau
1993 : The club is renamed Azhar Kokshetau

See also
 FC Okzhetpes

Azhar, FC
Sport in Kokshetau
Football clubs in Kokshetau
1992 establishments in Kazakhstan